Memories of the Future is the first collaborative studio album by electronic musicians kode9 and Spaceape. A review in Tiny Mix Tapes described it as "an important release in dubstep's development." A circumspect review in Resident Advisor noted the "intensity" of the album's "atmosphere", but argued that its quality was somewhat uneven. Journalist Joel Schalit  compared it to the work of Linton Kwesi Johnson and Philip K. Dick and argued that it represented the mental distress suffered by minorities in England. Exclaim! called it the "rightful heir" to Tricky's Maxinquaye.

Track listing 
Glass	         4:30
Victims 3:51
Backward	 4:43
Nine	         1:54
Curious	 4:58
Portal	         4:25
Addiction	 3:40
Sine	         5:21
Correction	 3:15
Kingstown	 4:40
Nine Samurai	 3:40
Bodies	         2:26
Lime	         1:55
Quantum 3:18

References

External links 
 

2006 albums
Collaborative albums
Hyperdub albums